Barbra: The Music, The Mem'ries, The Magic was a concert tour by American recording artist Barbra Streisand.  The tour initially visited nine locations in North America, then was extended twice for a total of 16 shows in 14 cities. The performance in Miami (December 5, 2016) was filmed for a Netflix release on November 22, 2017.  A live album of the same name recorded during the concert tour was released on December 8, 2017. The tour was Directed by Barbra Streisand and Richard Jay-Alexander. Production Design by Jeremy Railton & Alex M. Calle. Lighting Design by Peter Morse.

Background 
The concert tour was Streisand's seventh, preceded by the 2012–13 Barbra Live tour.  On May 16, 2016, Streisand's longtime manager Martin Erlichman announced that she is gearing up for a new Broadway duets album, Encore: Movie Partners Sing Broadway to be released following a nine-city concert tour of North America in August.  The concert setlist would feature hits spanning Streisand's career as well as songs from the upcoming album.

Critical response 
Variety noted: At 74 years old, Streisand doesn’t always hit the power notes — as ironically evidenced in opening number, "The Way We Were" — but a few spots of pitchy imperfection could hardly detract from the sheer magic of watching a living icon return to the stage after a three-year absence, recounting her storied career through a varied set list that included tracks off each of her No. 1 selling albums, from "Stoney End" to "Woman in Love" to "No More Tears (Enough is Enough)", her disco-fied duet with the late Donna Summer.

Los Angeles Times: Barbra Streisand was working toward a moment — the end of the first act of the first show of her first concert tour in years — when she decided something wasn’t quite right. She’d just brought the house down at Staples Center with a thrilling, deeply felt rendition of Stephen Sondheim's "Being Alive," and now, in a demonstration of her range, Streisand's large band was easing into the hushed "Papa, Can You Hear Me?" from "Yentl," her movie about gender and Judaism in Eastern Europe in the early 1900s. Yet an adjustment was in order. Turning her attention to a small table near the edge of the stage, the singer picked up what looked like an unlit candle, turned the thing over and flipped a tiny switch. The decoration flickered to life.

NewsDay: When Barbra Streisand stepped onto the Barclays Center stage and almost immediately began belting out "The Way We Were," it was clear we were in for a daring show. Starting with a beloved showstopper is like throwing down the music gauntlet, promising that what is in store will surpass previous tours. And somehow Streisand delivered."This is what the evening is all about," as she launched into the classic, before adding, "Think of your memories too."The limited nine-city "Barbra: The Music . . . The Mem’ries . . . The Magic!" tour, which also includes another Barclays Center show Saturday, is in some ways a preview of her upcoming album Encore: Movie Partners Sing Broadway out on Aug. 26, which includes duets with Hugh Jackman, Alec Baldwin, Melissa McCarthy and others. But it's also a way for her to once again put her imprint on today's culture.

Commercial reception 
Ticket pre-sales began for American Express card members on May 18 for U.S. venues and May 19 for the Canadian venue; along with a pre-sale purchase fans received a copy of the new album. General public ticket sales began on May 25. Tickets prices ranged between $90 and $510.

The tour is presented by Live Nation Global Touring and S2BN Entertainment.

Set list
This set list is representative of the performance on August 11, 2016. It does not represent all concerts for the duration of the tour.   
Act I
 "The Way We Were"
 "Everything"
 "Being at War with Each Other" (Carole King)
 "Everything Must Change" (Quincy Jones)
 "Woman in Love"
 "Stoney End" (Laura Nyro)
 "No More Tears (Enough Is Enough)"
 "Evergreen (Love Theme from A Star Is Born)"  (with Babyface)
 "You Don't Bring Me Flowers"
 "Being Alive"
 "Papa, Can You Hear Me?" 
Act II

 "Pure Imagination"  (with Seth MacFarlane)
 "Who Can I Turn To (When Nobody Needs Me)"  (with Anthony Newley)
 "Losing My Mind"
 "Loving You"  (with Patrick Wilson)
 "Climb Ev'ry Mountain"  (with Jamie Foxx)
 "Isn't This Better?" 
 "How Lucky Can You Get?"
 "With One More Look at You"/"Watch Closely Now"
 "Children Will Listen"
 "Don't Rain on My Parade"
 "People"
 "Happy Days Are Here Again"
 "I Didn't Know What Time It Was" 

Sources:

Tour dates

All dates were sold out.
Attendance indicates theatre capacity.

References

2016 concert tours
2017 concert tours
Barbra Streisand concert tours
Netflix specials
Concert tours of the United States
Concert tours of Canada